The Kidderminster and Stourport Electric Tramway Company operated an electric tramway service between Kidderminster and Stourport-on-Severn between 1898 and 1929.

History

The tramway was authorised by the Kidderminster & Stourport Electric Tramway Act of 1896. The company was established as a subsidiary of the British Electric Traction group.

A Kidderminster company George Law was responsible for the construction at a cost of £23,314.  The depot and generating station were constructed off New Road, Kidderminster; a single track laid along two routes; and four bridges were widened.

The system was notable at the start for having vestibuled cars with windscreens to protect the driver, whereas most other systems, the driver was exposed to the elements.

Closure

The system closed on 2 April 1929.

See also
Kinver Light Railway (1901–1930) another contemporary local route operated by British Electric Traction group

References

Tram transport in England
3 ft 6 in gauge railways in England